Live in Japan is a live album by pianist Duke Jordan's Trio recorded on their 1976 Japanese Tour and first released on the Danish SteepleChase label as a double LP in 1977 then as two separate volumes on CD with additional material in 1994.

Reception

AllMusic rated the album with 3 stars.

Track listing
All compositions by Duke Jordan except as indicated
 "I'll Remember April" (Gene de Paul, Patricia Johnston, Don Raye) - 3:17 Bonus track on Vol. 1 CD release 
 "Flight to Jordan" - 6:10
 "Forecast" - 6:40
 "Paula" - 3:25
 "There's a Star for You" - 7:17 Bonus track on Vol. 1 CD release  
 "Bluebird" (Charlie Parker) - 5:55
 "Misty Thursday" - 5:40
 "W'utless" - 5:35
 "Scotch Blues" - 6:45
 "Jordu" - 5:55
 "Two Loves" - 3:15
 "(In My) Solitude" (Duke Ellington, Eddie DeLange, Irving Mills) - 3:30
 "No Problem" - 9:10
 "Cold Bordeaux Blues" - 6:45
 "Tall Grass" - 4:05
 "I'm Gonna Learn Your Style" - 4:10
 "Embraceable You" (George Gershwin, Ira Gershwin) - 4:40
 "Night Train from Snekkersten" - 6:10
 "Cherokee" (Ray Noble) - 9:22 Bonus track on Vol. 2 CD release   
 "Jordu" - 2:25
 "Flight to Japan" - 1:40

Personnel
Duke Jordan - piano
Wilbur Little - bass 
Roy Haynes - drums

References

1977 live albums
Duke Jordan live albums
SteepleChase Records live albums